Ralph Anthony Howard is an American politician. He is a member of the Alabama House of Representatives from the 72nd District, serving since 2005. He is a member of the Democratic party.

References

Living people
Democratic Party members of the Alabama House of Representatives
21st-century American politicians
Year of birth missing (living people)
Place of birth missing (living people)